Avatar is a Swedish heavy metal band, formed in Gothenburg in 2001. The band has released nine studio albums, the most recent being Dance Devil Dance in 2023. The band has had some success on US rock radio, notably with their song "New Land", which peaked at number 20 on the Billboard Mainstream Rock Songs chart in May 2017.

History

Formation and early releases (2001−2010)
The band was formed in 2001 by drummer John Alfredsson and guitarist Jonas Jarlsby, who at the time were in separate bands. After several lineup changes, the band released two four-song EP demos in 2004: Personal Observations released on 18 January 2004 and 4 Reasons to Die on 19 November 2004. Avatar's first studio album, Thoughts of No Tomorrow, was released on 25 January 2006 and peaked at #47 on the Sweden Albums Top 60. The band completed several European tours as a supporting act for Impaled Nazarene, Evergrey, and In Flames. 

Avatar's second album, Schlacht, was released on 24 October 2007, reaching spot 27 on the Swedish album chart. Björn Gelotte from In Flames contributed a guitar solo on the track "Letters from Neverend". The subsequent set of tours saw them perform at the 2008 Sweden Rock Festival as well as shows in support of Obituary (January–February 2008), and Hardcore Superstar (October–November 2009).

The band's third album, the self-titled Avatar, was released in Sweden in November 2009 and reached the 36th position on the national album chart. In January 2010 the music video for the song "Queen of Blades" was released on the band's website. Around that time, the band signed with Sony Music for the German and Swiss release of their latest album on 26 March 2010.  In April of the same year a deal was signed with the Japanese label Art Union, for a 19 May launch of the album. They then launched into an ambitious touring schedule appearing at the 2010 Storsjöyran, and also with Warrior Soul (March–April 2010), Dark Tranquillity (October–November 2010), and Helloween (December 2010 – January 2011).

Black Waltz and Hail the Apocalypse (2011−2015)

In December 2011 guitarist Simon Andersson left the band, being replaced by Tim Öhrström. On 25 January 2012 the album Black Waltz was released in Europe. It reached position 25 on the album list in Avatar's native Sweden. The album was released in the US on 14 February. Black Waltz marks the first appearance of the "Clown" face paint now worn regularly by Eckerström. To support the American release of Black Waltz, Avatar embarked on its first ever U.S. tour alongside Lacuna Coil and Sevendust in February 2013.

In August 2013, after the wife of Device and Disturbed vocalist David Draiman gave birth and Draiman opted to bow out of his tour schedule, Avatar was picked by Avenged Sevenfold to replace Device and continue to tour with them and Five Finger Death Punch. The following fall, the band spent a month in Thailand recording for a new album, planned for release in March 2014.
On 11 March 2014 it was announced that Avatar's fifth album would be titled Hail the Apocalypse and was released 13 May 2014 via eOne Music. The album's first single, the title track, was released 17 March 2014 and was accompanied by a video. The new album is produced by Tobias Lindell and mixed by Jay Ruston.
Since the release of Hail the Apocalypse, Avatar has conducted several tours of the U.S. and Europe as both a supporting and headline act, as well as performing at festivals such as Rock on the Range 2014 and the inaugural Louder Than Life. The music video for 'Vultures Fly' premiered on 26 January 2015 and earned distinction by being voted #1 for five weeks in a row in Loudwire's Battle Royal video countdown, as well as their 2015 Best Rock Video. Avatar then began a U.S. tour in April 2015 consisting of headline performances, and supporting Five Finger Death Punch and Mushroomhead.

On 6 May 2015 it was announced that Avatar would be included in the lineup of Shiprocked 2016. Avatar returned to the U.S. for another headline tour in August–September 2015 with Gemini Syndrome and First Decree, and in January–February 2016 with September Mourning prior to returning to Sweden to complete writing on the follow up to Hail The Apocalypse. Sylvia Massy was announced as producer of that album, which was then recorded in three studios across Europe. Towards the end of 2015, it was announced Avatar would be scheduled to appear at several festivals in 2016, to include Rock on the Range and Carolina Rebellion.

Feathers & Flesh (2016−2017)
After several tours supporting 2014's Hail the Apocalypse, Avatar entered the studio in December 2015 to begin recording a then unnamed follow-up studio album. The band split their time between three European studios — Castle Studios in Rohrsdorf, Germany, Finnvox Studios in Helsinki, Finland and Spinroad Studios in Lindome, Sweden. Acclaimed producer Sylvia Massy, noted for her work with Tool and Red Hot Chili Peppers, praised Avatar as "relentless," noting singer Johannes Eckerström as having "wild energy and charisma." The start of recording sessions also coincided with multiple updates via the band's Instagram account, chronicling their time in the studio. Once recording finished, Avatar took part in Shiprocked 2016, then toured the southern United States with September Mourning and Saint Diablo. On 30 January 2016 in Dallas, Texas, Avatar performed the song "For The Swarm" for the first time, the first original song since the release of their previous album.

On 3 March 2016, Avatar revealed the name of the new album, Feathers & Flesh, via their official website, and through social media. A release date of 13 May 2016 was also announced, as well as several pre-ordering merchandise bundles that would be available to order on 17 March 2016.  One bundle offers a 60-page, 109-verse poem hardcover book described on the band's Facebook as 'a story too extensive for any booklet'. The first single, "For The Swarm," was released as a reward for those pre-ordering the album on iTunes. A music video of this single was also released. Fan reception of the new song and video were high, as evidenced in For The Swarm being voted #1 in  Loudwire's Battle Royale for the week ending 11 March 2016. On 17 March 2016 the singles, "Regret" and "House of Eternal Hunt" were released to help kick off pre-ordering of merchandise bundles for Feathers & Flesh. A video directed by Johan Carlén was released featuring the two songs playing sequentially as the view pans around a darkened art gallery, with many paintings of birds, primarily owls, mirroring some of the artwork that the band has created for the individual songs on their album. "Regret," as the opening track on the album, is described by the band as “an intense journey through epicness” and, “...by far the most different album-intro we ever written”. The song introduces The Owl, the protagonist of the album as she lays dying, reflecting on her past. "House of Eternal Hunt," described by the band as "the definition of metal", starts the tale of The Owl, a "predator ruling the sky" according to Eckerström. The first official single, "The Eagle Has Landed," was released 25 March 2016. As with the previously released singles, this track was an instant gratification reward for pre-ordering Feathers & Flesh. The song introduces The Eagle, "...crashing into the world of his adversary", according to Eckerström. While no new music video was released with this track, the band uploaded the song to its official YouTube channel with the same video featured for the release of "Regret" and "House of Eternal Hunt."

On 12 June 2017, Avatar were awarded the Breakthrough Band Award at the Metal Hammer Golden Gods.

Avatar Country (2017−2020)

On 24 October 2017, Avatar released a new single called "A Statue of the King", along with the announcement that they will release their seventh album, Avatar Country, on 12 January 2018. It was also announced the dates of the new Avatar tour, Called "Avatar Country Tour", which starts in January 2018 in North America and arrives in Europe in March of the same year. On 13 December the song "The King Wants You" was released on SiriusXM Octane radio, and soon available on digital platforms, being the second single from the album "Avatar Country". The official music video was released on 19 December.

On 12 January 2018, Avatar Country was released worldwide, available both through streaming services such as Spotify, and in physical formats from music stores throughout the world. On 29 October 2018, the band launched a Kickstarter campaign for Legend of Avatar Country which has been described as "A film featurette based on the album Avatar Country by the band Avatar." The band needed to meet funding of $50,000 and as of 31 October 2018, the band has over $110,000 raised for the film.

Hunter Gatherer, 2021 singles and Dance Devil Dance (2020−present) 
In early December 2019, Avatar announced that they had begun recording their next album at Sphere Studios in Los Angeles. An interview with Loudwire in January and later a paywalled video by the band itself revealed that Slipknot and Stone Sour frontman Corey Taylor has a cameo in the song "Secret Door". The same interview also revealed the names of a few other songs on the yet unnamed album: "Colossus", "Child", "Scream Into The Void", and "Silence In The Age Of Apes". Speaking of the tone of the album, Eckerström told Loudwire "Avatar Country, we wanted to see if we could do comedy ... It was funny and we wanted to see if we could make something funny ... But it was humorous for us, and now it’s important for us to do something devoid of humor, there is no joking around with this and it pulls us back into reality. It deals more with darkness, sadness, detachment, alienation and the anxiety of thinking of the world at large." In a YouTube video and a tweet on 1 May 2020, the band announced the end of the "Avatar Country" era and teased the upcoming album with the question "Will you hunt with us?".

The name "Hunter Gatherer" and the release date of 7 August 2020 were announced through another video on 5 May 2020.

The music video for "Silence in the Age of Apes" was released on 14 May 2020 and was released on streaming platforms the following day.

Two singles entitled "Going Hunting" and "Barren Cloth Mother" were released on August 31 and September 1, 2021, respectively, ahead of the band's Going Hunting tour. At the same time, the band announced their split with their record label eOne and the inception of their own label, Black Waltz Records.

"Going Hunting" was elected by Loudwire as the 34th best metal song of 2021.

As of June 2022, Avatar has been working on new material for their ninth studio album, Dance Devil Dance, released on February 17 2023. Four singles from it have been released ahead of the album's release.

Musical style and influences

Avatar has been described as a heavy metal band, and more specifically as melodic death metal and groove metal. The band has also been referred to as a "grease-painted Swedish death/industrial/progressive metal ensemble". Originally a pure melodic death metal band, Avatar later began to play a different style of music, moving to a more avant-garde metal style.

Avatar was shaped primarily by the melodic death metal of In Flames and the Haunted, with additional musical influences coming from the industrial machine style of Rammstein, Marilyn Manson and Ministry. Avatar's earliest influences include Beethoven, the Beatles, Iron Maiden and Black Sabbath. They took style cues from Helloween, Strapping Young Lad, Devin Townsend, Thin Lizzy, Meshuggah, Gojira, and Cryptopsy.

Band members

Current members
 Jonas "Kungen" Jarlsby – guitars (2001–present)
 John Alfredsson – drums (2001–present)
 Johannes Eckerström – lead vocals (2002–present), trombone (2018–present), piano, keyboards (2021–present) 
 Henrik Sandelin – bass, backing vocals (2003–present)
 Tim Öhrström – guitars, backing vocals (2011–present)

Former members
 Simon Andersson – guitars (2003–2011)

Discography

Studio albums

Live

EP

Demo

Singles

Music videos

Filmography

Awards and nominations

References

External links

 Official website

Musical groups established in 2001
Musical groups from Gothenburg
Groove metal musical groups
Experimental musical groups
Swedish progressive metal musical groups
Avant-garde metal musical groups
Swedish melodic death metal musical groups
2001 establishments in Sweden